Range War is a 1939 American Western film directed by Lesley Selander and written by Sam Robins and Walter C. Roberts. The film stars William Boyd, Russell Hayden, Britt Wood, Pedro de Cordoba, Willard Robertson, Matt Moore and Betty Moran. The film was released on September 8, 1939, by Paramount Pictures.

Plot
Buck Colins heads a group of local ranchers who are trying to prevent the railroad from completing its line through their property. Till now they have been able to charge tolls on herds passing through. Hoppy goes undercover to expose them.

Cast  
 William Boyd as Hopalong Cassidy
 Russell Hayden as Lucky Jenkins
 Britt Wood as Speedy MacGinnis
 Pedro de Cordoba as Padre Jose 
 Willard Robertson as Buck Collins
 Matt Moore as Jim Marlow
 Betty Moran as Ellen Marlow
 Kenneth Harlan as Charles Higgins
 Francis McDonald as Dave Morgan
 Eddie Dean as Henchman Pete
 Earle Hodgins as Deputy Sheriff
 Jason Robards, Sr. as Rancher 
 Stanley Price as Agitator
 Ray Bennett as Henchman Stokey

References

External links 
 
 
 
 

1939 films
American black-and-white films
Films directed by Lesley Selander
1930s English-language films
Films scored by Victor Young
1939 Western (genre) films
American Western (genre) films
Hopalong Cassidy films
1930s American films